The Citadel of Ghazni (or Ghuznee, Ghazna) is a large medieval fortress located in Ghazni city, east-central Afghanistan. It was built in the 13th century surrounding the Ghazni town to form a walled city. The 45 metre (147 foot) high citadel dominates the skyline.

The citadel is at risk of destruction due to multiple threats. Already more than half of the citadel's 32 original towers have been destroyed or heavily damaged with the collapse of one tower being caught on video in June, 2019 and being shared widely on social media. The citadel is located in the center of the city and nearby major roads. A lack funds to aid in the site's preservation, heavy rains, and the country's ongoing civil war have further contributed to the citadel's collapse.

History

In 962, the Turkic slave commander of the Samanid Empire, Alp-Tegin, attacked Ghazni and besieged the citadel for four months. He wrested Ghazni from the Lawik ruler, Abu Bakr Lawik. Alp-Tegin was accompanied by Sabuktigin during this conquest.

In 1839, the citadel was the site of the battle of Ghazni during the first Anglo-Afghan war when the British troops stormed and captured the citadel. It saw further violence during later decades of wars.

On 14 June 2019, a tower collapsed due to heavy rain and possible government negligence.

Threats
The old citadel of Ghazni is in a deteriorating condition. Many of the towers and walls of the fortress are crumbling. Decades of war and continued political instability in Afghanistan have contributed to the deterioration of the fortress. War and lack of funds have hampered restoration efforts.

In June, 2019 one of the fort's 32 original towers collapsed and was caught on video and posted to social media sparking international calls for the Afghan government and international community to do more to preserve the country's cultural heritage.

Gallery

See also
 Ghazni Minarets

References 

Ghazni Province
Populated places in Ghazni Province
Forts in Afghanistan
World Heritage Sites in Danger

Buildings and structures in Ghazni Province